Christianity is one of the religions in Tripura, a state in North East India. According to the Indian Census 2011, the population of Christians in Tripura is 159,882 or 4.35% of the total population. Christians are mostly found among the indigenous communities of the state such as the Tripuri, Lushai, Kuki, Darlong, Halam etc. Among the Scheduled Tribes of the state Christians share is 13.12% of the population.

History
The beginning of the Christian faith in Tripura dates back many centuries. Fr. Ignatius Gomes, a Jesuit priest made the first reference to the Christians of Mariamnagar in Agartala when he visited them in 1683. Fr. P. Barbe, the Pastor of Chittagong, visited Tripura in 1843. Holy Cross pioneering missionaries Fr. Louis Augustine Verite and Fr. Beboit Adolphe Mercier visited Agartala in 1856 and administered sacraments to the Christians in Mariamnagar Village. But it was only from 1937 that priests began to take permanent residence at Mariamnagar.

The Tripura Baptist Christian Union was formed under the leadership of Rev. M.J. Eade in December 1938 in Lakshmilunga, a village six miles from Agartala. The Baptist Mission Compound at Arundhutinagar, Agartala was also established in the year 1938 under an official land grant by the then King of Tripura Kingdom Maharaja Bir Bikram Kishore Manikya to the missionaries from New Zealand Baptist Missionary Society (NZBMS).

The first Roman Catholic Parish in Tripura was erected at Mariamnagar in 1939. The first permanent Church (at present the temporary Cathedral) was blessed in 1952. Because of its geographical proximity, the Archdiocese of Dhaka continued to cater to the spiritual needs of the Catholics in Tripura till the erection of the new Ecclesiastical Unit in 1952, namely, the Prefecture of Haflong. In 1969, the Prefecture was upgraded to the position of a Diocese and Most Rev. Denzil D'Souza, DD, was the first Bishop of Silchar. At that time the Diocese comprised the States of Mizoram and Tripura and the District of Cachar in Assam. On 11 January 1996, Pope John Paul II decreed the erection of the Diocese of Agartala. The new Diocese of Agartala, comprising the entire State of Tripura was bifurcated from the erstwhile Diocese of Silchar. Most Rev. Lumen Monteiro, CSC, DD, was appointed the first Bishop of the new Diocese. He was ordained and installed on 26 May 1996.

Denominations
The major denominations of Christianity present in the state are the Baptist, Presbyterian Church of India (PCI) and the Roman Catholic Churches.
There are also many churches of the Believers' Church, Assembly of God, Evangelical and Christian Churches in the state. and also Christian Revival Church.

Statistics

Demographics

Trends
Percentage of Christians in Tripura by decades

Tribes
Percentage of Christians in the Scheduled Tribes

Major churches
 Agartala Baptist Church, first church in Agartala city.
 Jangalia Baptist Church, largest Baptist church in the state.
 Mariamnagar Catholic Parish, oldest Christian community in the state
 Zion Baptist Church established in 1983
 Birchandra Baptist Church  (KBPC)
 Khumulwng Baptist Church

See also
 Tripura Baptist Christian Union
 Tripura Presbyterian Church Synod
 Roman Catholic Diocese of Agartala
 List of Christian denominations in North East India
Christian Revival Church

References

Bibliography 
 Debbarma, Sukhendu (1996) Origin and Growth of Christianity in Tripura: With Special Reference to the New Zealand Baptist Missionary Society, 1938-1988, Indus Publishing, New Delhi. 
 Borok Baptist Convention, Rangchak Mukumu, 2010
Jain, Sandhya (2010). Evangelical intrusions: [Tripura, a case study]. New Delhi: Rupa & Co.

External links
 Tripura Baptist Christian Union (TBCU) website
 Roman Catholic Diocese of Agartala website
 ICI website

 
Religion in Tripura